Gambling with God is the second studio album by the Canadian indie-rock girl group Magneta Lane, released September 15, 2009 on Last Gang Records in Canada. Gambling with God is available in the United States for download as of November 9, 2010.

Background
Lead singer Lexi Valentine said that the album "is about finding out exactly where you want to go and getting there without stopping for anything — but taking those things that matter along the way" when asked about the record. She also stated that "It's also about power, strength and heart. And being honest with yourself. The sound is hopeful, bright, and at peace with life's twists and turns."

Track listing
"Lady Bones" - 3:14
"Violet's Constellations" - 4:20
"House of Mirrors" - 3:06
"Castles" - 4:14
"September Came" - 3:52
"Bloody French" - 3:42
"Love and Greed" - 4:00
"Gambling With God" - 3:09
"All the Red Feelings" - 3:53
"Queen of Hearts" - 4:04
"Shatter" - 3:22 (US Bonus Track)

Tour

Magneta Lane is set to hit the road in the United States in 2011 to support the release on November 9, 2010.

References

2009 albums
Magneta Lane albums